Oliver Markoutz (born 14 January 1995) is an Austrian footballer who currently plays for Austria Klagenfurt.

References

External links
 

1995 births
Living people
Austrian footballers
Austrian expatriate footballers
SKN St. Pölten players
Floridsdorfer AC players
FC Bayern Munich II players
SK Austria Klagenfurt players
2. Liga (Austria) players
Regionalliga players
Association football wingers
Association football forwards
Expatriate footballers in Germany
Austrian expatriate sportspeople in Germany